Kassim Guyazou (born 7 January 1982) is a Togolese football (midfielder) currently playing for Foolad Yazd F.C.

Club career
Guyazou previously played for Diósgyőri VTK in the Hungarian National Championship I.

References

External links
Official site profile
 

1982 births
Living people
Togolese footballers
Expatriate footballers in Iran
Expatriate footballers in Hungary
Steel Azin F.C. players
Gostaresh Foulad F.C. players
AS Douanes (Togo) players
Étoile Filante du Togo players
Association football midfielders
Togo international footballers
21st-century Togolese people